Darap is a census village in West Sikkim district, Sikkim, India. As per the 2011 Census of India, Darap village has a total population of 1,743 people including 901 males and 842 females.

Darap village is 8 KM away from Pelling town and is a tourist place.

References 

Villages in Gyalshing district